Drums of Mer is a 1933 Australian novel by Ion Idriess set in the Torres Strait.

Background
It was based on a true story about the survivors of the wrecked ship the Charles Eaton. The characters were composites of real people.

Idriess later called the book "'a blood-thirsty thing, and it's
told from the angle of the Torres Strait islanders. There are killings and wars and all sorts of horrible things in it, but it seems to appeal. I was a bit frightened at first, that the womenfolk would not like it. They seem to want it, however."

Idriess later reworked the same material in a children's book, Headhunters of the Coral Sea.

Proposed film adaptation
Sandy Harbutt planned to make a film version of it in the late 1970s with his then-wife Helen Morse as associate producer. Research trips were undertaken to various locations in 1977.  In October 1977 Harbutt was reportedly writing a script in the New Hebridies and hoped to start filming in April 1978. In 1999 Harbutt said he still intended to make the movie. However no film resulted.

Dance adaptation
In 1996 the Aboriginal Islander Dance Theatre presented a theatre production based on the novel.

External links
Maureen Faury, "A Novel Approach to Tradition: Torres Strait Islanders and Ion Idriess", Australian Journal of Anthropology, 1997, 8:3,247-258

References

1933 Australian novels
Australian adventure novels
Torres Strait Islands culture
Novels by Ion Idriess
Novels set on islands
Angus & Robertson books